6 Cassiopeiae (6 Cas) is a white hypergiant in the constellation Cassiopeia, and a small-amplitude variable star.

System
6 Cassiopeiae A is a white A2.5 type hypergiant. It is about 25 times as massive as the Sun and 200,000 times as luminous.  The star is slightly and erratically variable, an Alpha Cygni variable.  Not all sources consider 6 Cas to be a hypergiant.  It is thought that the "+" in an early A3 Ia+ spectral classification referred to indications of additional spectral features from a possible companion rather than the more modern indication of a hypergiant luminosity class.  However, later publications have given more conventional hypergiant spectral types such as B9Ia+ and A3Ia+.

6 Cas A has a number of close companions, most notably an 8th magnitude O class bright giant at only . Its spectral type is O9.75 and its absolute magnitude is −5.8.  Both are considered to be members of the Cassiopeia OB5 stellar association at a distance of around 8,000 light-years, along with several other nearby stars.  Gaia parallaxes of the nearby stars suggest a mean distance to the association of about 9,000 light years.

Variability
6 Cas A is an α Cyg variable, pulsating erratically between 5.34 and 5.45.  The strongest period detected in one study was 37 days.  It has the variable star designation V566 Cassiopeiae.

References

External links
6 Cassiopeiae at Jim Kaler's Stars

A-type hypergiants
Cassiopeia (constellation)
Cassiopeiae, 06
9018
117447
117447
BD+61 2533
Cassiopeiae, V566
Alpha Cygni variables
Multiple stars
O-type bright giants